"Love Glove" is a single by the British pop group Visage, released on Polydor Records in August 1984. It was the first single to be released from Visage's third album, Beat Boy, and peaked at #54 on the UK Singles Chart.

Music video
Two music videos for "Love Glove" exist. One version is the clip shot in Egypt by Jean-Claude Luyat, as a part of a full-length video incorporating songs from The Anvil and Beat Boy. It features Egyptian pyramids and Steve Strange riding a camel across the desert as well as singing on a yacht. This version was later included on the Visage video album in 1986.

Another version was shot by Nick Morris in London's Docklands in August 1984. In this version, Steve Strange appears in his Beat Boy album cover make up.

The cover art for the single features Steve Strange posing with two models, one of whom is Yasmin Le Bon.

Track listings
 7" single (1984)
A. "Love Glove" – 4:00
B. "She's a Machine" – 4:50

 12" single (1984)
A. "Love Glove" (Long Version) – 6:38
B1. "Love Glove" (Instrumental) – 3:24
B2. "She's a Machine" – 4:50

Personnel
Steve Strange — vocals
Rusty Egan — drums, electronic drums programming
Steve Barnacle — bass, synthesizer
Andy Barnett — guitar
Gary Barnacle - saxophone
Marsha Raven — backing vocals
Karen Ramsey — backing vocals
Rose Patterson — backing vocals

Chart performance

References

1984 singles
Visage (band) songs
Songs written by Steve Strange
Songs written by Rusty Egan
1984 songs
Polydor Records singles